Joyce Goldsmith (born 8 January 1942 in Melbourne, Australia) is an Australian former cricket player.
Goldsmith played three Test matches for the Australia women's national cricket team.

References

1942 births
Australia women Test cricketers
Living people